Maria Antonietta Picconi (born 23 September 1869, d. 1926) was an Italian composer and pianist born in Rome, Italy. She studied piano at the St. Cecilia Conservatory in Rome with Giovanni Sgambati and composition with Eugenio Terziani. She performed as a concert pianist from 1886 to 1896, and then worked as a piano and voice teacher. She died in Rome in 1926.

Works
Picconi was known for drawing-room songs. Selected works include:
Donna vorrei morir, romance for baritone and mezzo-soprano
Fiorellin di siepe, melody
Un Organetto from Sei Melodie per canto e pianoforte

References

1869 births
1926 deaths
19th-century classical composers
20th-century classical composers
Italian classical composers
Italian music educators
Women classical composers
Musicians from Rome
20th-century Italian composers
19th-century Italian composers
Women music educators
20th-century women composers
19th-century women composers